Fisty is an unincorporated community in Knott County, Kentucky, United States. Fisty has a post office with ZIP code 41743.

The name is said to have come from a local who went by "Fisty Sam" Combs. The name is pronounced as if spelled "feisty."

References

Unincorporated communities in Knott County, Kentucky
Unincorporated communities in Kentucky